The 1928 Kilkenny Senior Hurling Championship was the 34th staging of the Kilkenny Senior Hurling Championship since its establishment by the Kilkenny County Board.

On 17 June 1928, Mooncoin won the championship after a 4-03 to 3-02 defeat of Dicksboro in the final. It was their eighth championship title overall and their second title in succession.

Results

Final

References

Kilkenny Senior Hurling Championship
Kilkenny Senior Hurling Championship